Kalle Muuli (born 10 January 1958 in Tapa) is an Estonian journalist, poet and politician. He was a member of XIII Riigikogu.

References

Living people
1958 births
Estonian journalists
Estonian male poets
20th-century Estonian poets
21st-century Estonian poets
Isamaa politicians
Members of the Riigikogu, 2015–2019
Recipients of the Order of the White Star, 4th Class
University of Tartu alumni
People from Tapa, Estonia
Estonian editors